Allium haematochiton is a North American species of wild onion known by the common name redskin onion. It is native to northern Baja California, Sonora, and southern California as far north as Kern County. It grows on the slopes of the hills and mountains, such as those of the Peninsular Ranges, Transverse Ranges, and southern California Coast Ranges.

Description
Allium haematochiton has a small rhizome associated with clusters of brightly colored red bulbs. From these grow several naked green stems, each with a few withering, curling leaves.

Atop each stem is an inflorescence of several flowers, each on a short pedicel. Each flower is just under a centimeter wide and white to pinkish with dark midveins. There are six stout stamens around a white or pink ovary.

References

External links
Calphoto, University of California @ Berkeley, Allium haematochiton — Photo gallery

haematochiton
Flora of California
Flora of Baja California
Flora of Sonora
Natural history of the California chaparral and woodlands
Natural history of the Peninsular Ranges
Natural history of the Transverse Ranges
Taxa named by Sereno Watson